Mlatho Mponela Football Club are a Malawian football (soccer) club based in Mponela.
The team plays in TNM Super League.

Stadium
They play at the Silver Stadium which has a capacity of 20,000.

Honours
Central Region Football League
Winners (2): 2012–13. 2018

References

External links
Soccerway

Football clubs in Malawi